South of the Clouds is a 2014 Chinese comedy romance film directed by Guo Shuang and Feng Yuan. It was released on October 17.

Cast
Aarif Rahman as Li Ming
Isabelle Huang as A Long
Wu Xin
Rombo Shyy
Liu Zhuoting
Zhang Yilong
Cai Lu
Cui Baoyue
Liu Lei
Zhou Wei
Wang Xiaoshan

Reception
By October 20, the film had earned ¥2.02 million at the Chinese box office.

References

2014 romantic comedy films
Chinese romantic comedy films
2010s Mandarin-language films